El Tren de los Momentos (The Train of the Moments) is the eighth studio album recorded by Spanish singer-songwriter Alejandro Sanz, It was released by WEA Latina on November 7, 2006 (see 2006 in music). which counts with the collaborations of Juanes, Antonio Carmona (ex-Ketama), Shakira and Calle 13. It contains ten songs produced by him and Lulo Pérez and this diversity of voices allows approaching social, political and faith topics from differing points of view.

It was recorded in Havana, Miami, Bahamas and Madrid, with most recording taking place in a studio that Sanz has at his house in Miami.

The album won the Grammy Award for Best Latin Pop Album at the 50th Annual Grammy Awards. Also was nominated for a Latin Grammy Award for Album of the Year, at the 8th Annual Latin Grammy Awards which was awarded to La Llave de Mi Corazón by Juan Luis Guerra.

Track listing 
All songs written by Alejandro Sanz, except where noted.
 Enséñame Tus Manos – 3:51
 A la Primera Persona – 5:02
 Te lo Agradezco, Pero No (featuring Shakira) – 4:33
 Donde Convergemos – 4:56
 En la Planta de Tus Pies – 3:57
 La Peleita (René Pérez, Alejandro Sanz) – 4:45
 Se lo Dices Tú – 3:49
 Se Molestan – 3:06
 Te Quiero y Te Temo – 3:12
 El Tren de los Momentos – 3:00

Chart performance

Album

Singles

Sales and certifications

Personnel 

 Carlos Álvarez – Engineer
 Hammadi Bayard – EWI
 Yumar Bonachea – Snare drum
 Ariel Bringuez – Saxophone, tenor saxophone
 Antonio Carmona – Cajón in "Se lo Dices Tú" courtesy of Universal Music
 Gustavo Celis – Engineer
 Michael Ciro – Electric guitar
 Coco – Percussion
 Beth Cohen – Background vocals
 Jesús Cruz – Acoustic guitar, tres
 Jaume de Laiguana – Art direction, graphic design, photography
 Jorge Dobal – Trombone
 Luis Dulzaides – Percussion
 Fernando Favier – Cajón, percussion
 Valeria Gastaldi – Background vocals
 Armando Gola – Bass
 Tata Güines – Conga
 Carlos Francisco Hernández – Production assistant
 Andrés P. Jane – Baritone saxophone
 Juanes – Electric guitar in "La Peleíta" courtesy of Universal Music
 Lee Levin – Drums
 Stephen Marcussen – Mastering
 Alexei Moisés Sánchez Mesa – Production assistant

 Nomar Negroni – Drums
 Ana María Perera – Background vocals
 Gonzalo Pérez – Production assistant
 Lulo Pérez – Arranger, background vocals, electric guitar, flugelhorn, Hammond organ, keyboards, percussion, piano, programming, synthesizer, timbales, trumpet, producer
 René Pérez – Rapping in "La Peleíta" courtesy of White Lion
 Roberto Pérez – Trumpet, flugelhorn
 Kika Pulido – Background vocals
 Talita Real – Background vocals
 James Roach – Production assistant
 Thom Russo – Mixing
 Dayamí Sánchez – Background vocals
 Osmani Sánchez – Batás, shekere
 Manuela Sánchez Mitchel – Violin
 Alejandro Sanz – Vocals, acoustic guitar, arranger, Background Vocals, Double bass, electric guitar, piano, programming, producer
 Rafa Sardina – Engineer, mixer
 Pepo Scherman – Engineer
 Shakira – Vocals in "Te Lo Agradezco, Pero No" courtesy of Sony BMG
 Eddie Thomas – Background vocals
 Mr. Vega – Claves
 Luis E. Veltran – Saxophone
 Visitante – Programming in "La Peleíta"
 Dan Warner – Acoustic guitar, electric guitar, mandolin
 Stewart Whitmore – Digital editing

Special edition

El Tren de los Momentos: Edición Especial is the 2007 re-release of the album El Tren de los Momentos containing two CDs and one DVD. The CD 1 is the same as the original album, the CD 2 contains four previously unreleased tracks (including "No Lo Digo por Nada" with Alex González of Maná on the drums) and three remixes; the DVD includes music videos.

Track listing

CD (El Tren de los Momentos) 
 Enséñame Tus Manos – 3:51
 A la Primera Persona – 4:43
 Te Lo Agradezco, Pero No – 4:33
 Donde Convergemos – 4:56
 En la Planta de Tus Pies – 3:57
 La Peleíta (René Pérez, Alejandro Sanz) – 4:45
 Se Lo Dices Tú – 3:49
 Se Molestan – 3:06
 Te Quiero y Te Temo – 3:12
 El Tren de los Momentos – 3:00

CD (Más canciones y remezclas) 
 Cariño a Mares – 4:46
 Tiento – 4:22
 No Lo Digo por Nada – 4:30
 No Importa – 4:17
 A la Primera Persona Chosen Few Remix (Remixed by Boy Wonder and Now & Laterz featuring Reychesta Secret Weapon) – 4:19
 Te Lo Agradezco, Pero No (Luny Tunes and Tainy Remix) – 3:09
 Te Lo Agradezco, Pero No (Benztown Mixdown) – 4:30

DVD (Todas las imágenes) 
 A la Primera Persona (Video)
 A la Primera Persona (Making Of)
 Te Lo Agradezco, Pero No (Video)
 Te Lo Agradezco, Pero No (Making Of)
 El Tren de los Momentos (Cómo se grabó)
 "Alejandro en Corto" Especial de Cuatro TV

Track listing (Mexican re-edition)

CD (El Tren de los Momentos) 
 Enséñame Tus Manos – 3:51
 A la Primera Persona – 4:43
 Te Lo Agradezco, Pero No – 4:33
 Donde Convergemos – 4:56
 En la Planta de Tus Pies – 3:57
 La Peleíta (René Pérez, Alejandro Sanz) – 4:45
 Se Lo Dices Tú – 3:49
 Se Molestan – 3:06
 Te Quiero y Te Temo – 3:12
 El Tren de los Momentos – 3:00
 No Lo Digo por Nada – 4:30
 Cariño a Mares – 4:46
 A la Primera Persona Chosen Few Remix (Remixed by Boy Wonder and Now & Laterz featuring Reychesta Secret Weapon) – 4:19
 Te Lo Agradezco, Pero No (Luny Tunes and Tainy Remix) – 3:09

DVD (Todas Las Imágenes) 
 "Alejandro en Corto" Especial de Cuatro TV
 Galería de fotos

References

2006 albums
Alejandro Sanz albums
Warner Music Latina albums
Spanish-language albums
Albums produced by Luny Tunes
Grammy Award for Best Latin Pop Album